Naasioi (also Nasioi, Kieta, Kieta Talk, Aunge) is an East Papuan language spoken in the central mountains and southeast coast of Kieta District, Bougainville Province, Papua New Guinea.

Phonology

Vowels

Consonants

Nasals can be syllabic.

References

Languages of the Autonomous Region of Bougainville
South Bougainville languages